Akwatia is a town in Denkyembour, a district in the Eastern region of south Ghana and west of the Atewa Range in the Birim River basin. Akwatia has a 2013 settlement population of 23,766 people. Akwatia is the main center of diamond extraction in Ghana. The town is the center of the Denkyembour parliamentary constituency.

Facilities

Education
Schools include St. Rose's´High School and Akwatia Technical Institute. The local football club is the Akwatia Diamond Stars.

Healthcare
Akwatia can boast of two hospitals, The Saint Dominic's Hospital and The Ghanaian Consolidated Diamonds Company Hospital (G.C.D Hospital). 
The Saint Dominic's Hospital in Akwatia is a 320-bed facility, and well-equipped and the hospital opened an Eye Clinic in 2003.

Diamond mining

The Ghana government-owned Ghana Consolidated Diamonds (GCD) is the only formal commercial producer of diamonds, using strip mining with Manitowoc draglines. Large additional resources of diamonds have been identified in the nearby Birim River deposits, including an altered meta-lamproite that may represent a primary diamond source.

References 

Populated places in the Eastern Region (Ghana)